Ovula ovum, common name the common egg cowrie, is a species of sea snail, a marine gastropod mollusk in the family Ovulidae, the ovulids, cowry allies or false cowries.

Description
They are egg-shaped (hence the Latin name ovum, meaning egg). The surface of the shell is smooth, shiny and completely snow white, with a dark reddish-purple interior, visible through the wide and long aperture, which bears teeth on one side only. In the living cowries the mantle is black, with a pattern of small white spots in adults, while juveniles resemble some toxic nudibranchs of the genus Phyllidia owing to their orange yellow sensorial papillae. The lateral flaps of the mantle usually hide completely the white surface, but the mantle is quickly retracted into the shell opening when the cowry is disturbed.

Distribution
This species is distributed in the Red Sea and in the Indian Ocean along East Africa (Aldabra, Madagascar, Mozambique, Mauritius, Tanzania, Kenya, Chagos) and in Western and Central Pacific Ocean (New Zealand, Australia, North Sulawesi, Malaysia, Borneo, New Caledonia, Philippines, French Polynesia and southern Japan).

Habitat

References

 Morton B. & Morton JE. (1983). The sea shore ecology of Hong Kong. Hong Kong: Hong Kong University Press.
 Lorenz F. & Fehse D. (2009). The Living Ovulidae - A manual of the families of Allied Cowries: * Ovulidae, Pediculariidae and Eocypraeidae. Conchbooks, Hackenheim, Germany
 Jean-François Hamel & Annie Mercier - Observations on the biology of the common egg shell Ovula ovum in Majuro, Marshall Islands - SPC Trochus Information Bulletin #12 – June 2006
 Liu, J.Y. [Ruiyu] (ed.). (2008). Checklist of marine biota of China seas. China Science Press. 1267 pp.
 Spencer, H.G., Marshall, B.A. & Willan, R.C. (2009). Checklist of New Zealand living Mollusca. Pp 196-219. in: Gordon, D.P. (ed.) New Zealand inventory of biodiversity. Volume one. Kingdom Animalia: Radiata, Lophotrochozoa, Deuterostomia. Canterbury University Press, Christchurch

External links
 Linnaeus, C. (1758). Systema Naturae per regna tria naturae, secundum classes, ordines, genera, species, cum characteribus, differentiis, synonymis, locis. Editio decima, reformata [10th revised edition, vol. 1: 824 pp. Laurentius Salvius: Holmiae]
 Cate, C. N. 1973 - A systematic revision of the recent Cypraeid family Ovulidae - Veliger 15: 1-117
 Biolib 
 Doris 
 Eol 
 Ovula ovum

Ovulidae
Gastropods described in 1758
Taxa named by Carl Linnaeus